Henry Lee (c. 1657 – 6 September 1734) of Dungeon, Canterbury was an English Tory politician who sat in the House of Commons in three periods between 1685 and 1715.

Lee was the son of Dr John Lee, Archdeacon of Rochester and his third wife Anne English, daughter of Henry English of Maidstone. His father later took the name of Warner by Act of Parliament under the terms of the will of his uncle Dr John Warner, Bishop of Rochester. He matriculated at Balliol College, Oxford, on 4 July 1673, aged 16. He married Dorothy Howe, daughter of Sir George Grobham Howe, 1st Baronet and his wife Elizabeth Grimstone, daughter of Sir Harbottle Grimston, 2nd Baronet on 16 October 1679.

Lee purchased the manor of Dungeon in Kent. He became an alderman of Canterbury and in March 1685 was elected Member of Parliament (MP) for Canterbury as a Tory.  In 1687 he was elected Mayor of Canterbury, but dismissed from office by order of King James II. However he was re-elected MP for Canterbury in 1689 and held the seat until 1695. He was Colonel of a regiment of the Kent Militia in 1697. He was MP for Canterbury again from 1698 until he was defeated at the 1708 British general election. In 1704 he was appointed a Commissioner of Victualling. He was returned again for Canterbury at the 1710 British general election and was appointed a Commissioner for Victualling again in 1711. He was returned again at the 1713 general election but was defeated in 1715.

Lee died on 6 September 1734. His son Henry Lee Warner, who was MP for Hindon, pulled down the mansion of the Dungeon.

References

1650s births
1734 deaths
Year of birth uncertain
Politics of Canterbury
Mayors of Canterbury
Kent Militia officers
English MPs 1685–1687
English MPs 1689–1690
English MPs 1690–1695
English MPs 1698–1700
English MPs 1701
English MPs 1701–1702
English MPs 1702–1705
English MPs 1705–1707
Members of the Parliament of Great Britain for English constituencies
British MPs 1707–1708
British MPs 1710–1713
British MPs 1713–1715